Fort Whipple may refer to:

Fort Whipple, Arizona, first capital of Arizona Territory
Fort Whipple, Virginia, historical name for the U.S. Army's Fort Myer
 Fort Whipple, a song by King Gizzard & the Lizard Wizard, see Eyes Like the Sky